Mongounda is a village in the Lobaye region in the Central African Republic southwest of the capital, Bangui.

Nearby towns and villages include Bamango (8.4 nm), Bobili(3.0 nm), Ndimbi (2.3 nm), Bonguele (2.1 nm) and Banguele (7.5 nm).

References

Populated places in Lobaye